The Dublin Film Critics' Circle is an Irish film critic association. From 2006, every year, members of the association give out their annual awards.

Winners

2022 winners 
 Best Film – The Quiet Girl
 Best Director – Charlotte Wells, Aftersun
 Best Irish Film – The Quiet Girl
 Best Documentary – Moonage Daydream
 Best Actor – Colin Farrell, The Banshees of Inisherin
 Best Actress – Michelle Yeoh, Everything Everywhere All at Once
 Best Screenplay – Martin McDonagh, The Banshees of Inisherin
 Best Cinematography – Claudio Miranda, Top Gun: Maverick
 International Breakthrough 2022 – Amber Midthunder, Prey
 Irish Breakthrough Director 2022 – Alisha Weir, Matilda the Musical

2021 winners
 Best Film - The Power of the Dog
 Best Director - Jane Campion, The Power of the Dog
 Best Irish Film - Arracht
 Best Documentary - Summer of Soul (...Or, When the Revolution Could Not Be Televised)
 Best Actor - Benedict Cumberbatch, The Power of the Dog
 Best Actress - Frances McDormand, Nomadland & The Tragedy of Macbeth
 Best Screenplay - Jane Campion, The Power of the Dog
 Best Cinematography - Greig Fraser, Dune

2020 winners
 Best Film - Portrait of a Lady on Fire
 Best Director - Bong Joon Ho, Parasite
 Best Irish Film - Wolfwalkers
 Best Documentary - David Attenborough: A Life on Our Planet
 Best Actor - Adam Sandler, Uncut Gems
 Best Actress - Jessie Buckley, I’m Thinking of Ending Things
 Best Screenplay - Simon Blackwell and Armando Iannucci, The Personal History of David Copperfield
 Best Cinematography - Roger Deakins, 1917
 Breakthrough Award - Morfydd Clark, The Personal History of David Copperfield and Saint Maud

2019 winners
 Best Film - Marriage Story
 Best Director - Martin Scorsese, The Irishman
 Best Actor - Adam Driver, Marriage Story
 Best Actress - Scarlett Johansson, Marriage Story
 Best Screenplay - Noah Baumbach, Marriage Story
 Best Cinematography - Hoyte van Hoytema, Ad Astra
 Best Irish Film - Extra Ordinary
 Best Documentary - Apollo 11
 Breakthrough Performance 2019 - Aisling Franciosi, The Nightingale
 Breakthrough Director 2019 - Kantemir Balagov, Beanpole

2018 winners
 Best Film – Custody
 Best Director - Chloé Zhao, The Rider
 Best Irish Director - Rebecca Daly, Good Favour
 Best Screenplay - Lynne Ramsay, You Were Never Really Here
 Best Cinematography - Monika Lenczewska, Under the Tree
 Best Actor - Charlie Plummer, Lean on Pete
 Best Actress - Charlotte Rampling, Hannah
 Best Documentary - So Help Me God
 Best Irish Film - The Lonely Battle of Thomas Reid
 Michael Dwyer Discovery Award - Coralie Fargeat, Revenge
 George Byrne Maverick Award - Stephen Rea – Black 47
 Extraordinary Achievement - Bill Morrison, Dawson City: Frozen Time
 Jury Prize - Warwick Thornton, Sweet Country
 Jury Prize - Kathleen Hepburn, Never Steady, Never Still
 Jury Prize - Jian Liu, Have a Nice Day
 Jury Prize - Ryan Killackey, Yasuni Man

2017 winners
 Best Film – Aquarius
 Best Irish Film - Sanctuary
 Best Actress – Florence Pugh – Lady Macbeth
 Best Actor – Sherwan Haji – The Other Side of Hope
 Best Director – Lav Diaz – The Woman Who Left
 Best Cinematography – M. David Mullen – The Love Witch
 Best Screenplay – Kristina Grozeva and Petar Valchanov – Glory
 Best Irish Feature – Handsome Devil
 Best Irish Documentary – The Farthest
 Best Documentary – I Am Not Your Negro
 Jury Prize – Kristopher Avedisian – Donald Cried
 Jury Prize – Daouda Coulibaly – Wùlu
 Jury Prize – My Life as a Courgette
 Jury Prize – The Transfiguration
 George Byrne Maverick Award – Emer Reynolds
 Michael Dwyer Discovery Award – Blue Teapot cast – Sanctuary

2016 winners
 Best Film – I, Daniel Blake
 Best Director – Denis Villeneuve – Arrival
 Best Irish Film – A Date for Mad Mary
 Best Documentary – Weiner / Mattress Men (TIE)
 Best Actor – Dave Johns – I, Daniel Blake
 Best Actress – Amy Adams – Arrival
 Best Screenplay – Eric Heisserer – Arrival
 Best Cinematography – Seamus McGarvey – Nocturnal Animals
 Breakthrough Award (Irish) – Seana Kerslake
 Breakthrough Award (International) – Hayley Squires

2015 winners
 Best Film – Inside Out
 Best Irish Film – Brooklyn / The Queen of Ireland (TIE)
 Best Documentary – The Queen of Ireland
 Best Director – Alejandro G. Iñárritu – Birdman or (The Unexpected Virtue of Ignorance)
 Best Actor – Michael Fassbender – Steve Jobs
 Best Actress – Julianne Moore – Still Alice
 Breakthrough International – Daisy Ridley – Star Wars: The Force Awakens / Kitana Kiki Rodriguez and Mya Taylor – Tangerine (TIE)
 Breakthrough Irish – Jordanne Jones – I Used to Live Here

2014 winners
 Best Film – Boyhood
 Best Irish Film – Frank
 Best Documentary – Finding Vivian Maier
 Best Director – Richard Linklater – Boyhood
 Best Actor – Jake Gyllenhaal – Nightcrawler
 Best Actress – Marion Cotillard – Two Days, One Night
 Breakthrough Award – Jack O'Connell – '71, Starred Up, and Unbroken

2013 winners
 Best Film – Gravity
 Best Irish Film – Good Vibrations
 Best Screenplay – Before Midnight
 Best Documentary – The Act of Killing
 Best Cinematography – Emmanuel Lubezki – Gravity, and To the Wonder
 Best Director – Alfonso Cuarón – Gravity
 Best Actor – Bruce Dern – Nebraska
 Best Actress – Cate Blanchett – Blue Jasmine
 Breakthrough Award – Lake Bell and Joshua Oppenheimer

2012 winners
 Best Film – The Artist
 Best Irish Film – What Richard Did
 Best Documentary – Marina Abramović: The Artist is Present
 Best Director – Michael Haneke – Amour
 Best Actor – Joaquin Phoenix – The Master
 Best Actress – Emmanuelle Riva – Amour
 Breakthrough Award – Gareth Evans – The Raid: Redemption

2011 winners
 Best Film – Drive
 Best Irish Film – The Guard
 Best Foreign Language Film – A Separation
 Best Director – Nicolas Winding Refn – Drive
 Best Actor – Ryan Gosling – Drive
 Best Actress – Jessica Chastain – The Tree of Life
 Best Documentary – Senna
 Best Irish Documentary – Knuckle
 International Breakthrough Award – Jessica Chastain – The Help, Take Shelter, and The Tree of Life
 Irish Breakthrough Award – John Michael McDonagh – The Guard

2010 winners
 Best Film – A Prophet
 Best Irish Film – His & Hers
 Best Documentary – His & Hers
 Best Director – Jacques Audiard – A Prophet
 Best Actor – Tahar Rahim – A Prophet
 Best Actress – Jennifer Lawrence – Winter's Bone
 Breakthrough Award – Jennifer Lawrence – Winter's Bone
 Irish Breakthrough Award – Ken Wardrop – His & Hers

Decade awards
 Best Film of the Decade – There Will Be Blood
 Best Irish Film of the Decade – Adam & Paul, and Hunger (TIE)

2009 winners
 Best Film – Let the Right One In
 Best Irish Film – Waveriders
 Best Documentary – Anvil! The Story of Anvil
 Best Director – Kathryn Bigelow – The Hurt Locker
 Best Actor – Sean Penn – Milk
 Best Actress – Yolande Moreau – Séraphine
 Breakthrough Award – Neill Blomkamp – District 9
 Outstanding Achievement – Duncan Jones

2008 winners
 Best Film – There Will Be Blood
 Best Irish Film – Hunger
 Best Director – Paul Thomas Anderson – There Will Be Blood
 Best Actor – Daniel Day-Lewis – There Will Be Blood
 Best Actress – Kristin Scott Thomas – I've Loved You So Long
 Breakthrough Award – Steve McQueen – Hunger

2007 winners
 Best International Film – The Lives of Others
 Best Irish Film – Garage
 Best Director – David Fincher – Zodiac
 Best Actor – Ulrich Mühe – The Lives of Others
 Best Actress – Julie Christie – Away from Her
 Breakthrough Award – Saoirse Ronan – Atonement

2006 winners
 Best Film – Brokeback Mountain
 Best Irish Film – The Wind That Shakes the Barley
 Best Director – Martin Scorsese – The Departed
 Best Actor – Leonardo DiCaprio – The Departed
 Best Actress – Penélope Cruz – Volver
 Best Supporting Actor – Jack Nicholson – The Departed
 Best Supporting Actress – Abigail Breslin – Little Miss Sunshine
 Breakthrough Award – Noah Baumbach – The Squid and the Whale

References

External links
 Dublin Film Critics' Circle

Awards established in 2006
Irish culture
Irish film awards
Film critics associations
Film organisations in Ireland
Non-profit organisations based in Ireland